Cynthia A. Johnson (born August 19, 1958) is an American politician who served as a member of the Michigan House of Representatives from the 5th district from 2019 to 2022.

Early life and education 
Johnson was born on August 19, 1958 in the city of Detroit, Michigan. She graduated from Frank Cody High School. She was certified as a paralegal by the American Institute for Paralegal Studies. She earned an associate degree from Wayne County Community College and a bachelor’s degree in business management from Walsh College.

Career 
Johnson ran for office in the Michigan House of Representatives five times before being elected on November 6, 2018 as the representative from District 5. Since 2013, Johnson has hosted the radio show, StandUp Now with Cynthia A. Johnson. Johnson currently serves as Chaplain of the Michigan Legislative Black Caucus. During the beginning of her term, Johnson served on three committees: the Families, Children, and Seniors committee, the Agriculture committee, and as the Minority Chair of House Oversight.

On December 2, 2020, Johnson appeared on a House Oversight Committee panel, which heard testimony from Rudy Giuliani and four other witnesses in regard to alleged election fraud in the 2020 presidential election. Johnson disputed the claims of fraud. After the hearing, Johnson received voicemail lynching threats. Johnson posted a video in response to these threats, in which she warned supporters of President Donald Trump to "Be careful. Walk lightly", further stating that "And for those of you who are soldiers, you know how to do it. Do it right. Be in order. Make them pay." Laura Cox, chairwoman of the Michigan Republican Party found this video to be threatening to members of her party. On December 9, 2020, Michigan House Speaker Lee Chatfield, in a statement supported by Speaker-elect Jason Wentworth, removed Johnson from all three committees she had been a part of, because of the video's contents.

Johnson was disqualified from running in the 2022 Democratic primary for her re-election in the newly dawn 1st state House district, as she did not submit required campaign finance paperwork.

Personal life 
Around 1975, Johnson was married to Wallace F. Hoskins Jr. Johnson is a Christian.

References

External links 
 Cynthia A. Johnson at Ballotpedia
 Cynthia A. Johnson at housedems.com

Living people
1958 births
African-American women in politics
African-American state legislators in Michigan
Christians from Michigan
Walsh College alumni
Wayne County Community College District alumni
Democratic Party members of the Michigan House of Representatives
21st-century American politicians
21st-century American women politicians
Radio personalities from Detroit
Women state legislators in Michigan
21st-century African-American women
21st-century African-American politicians
20th-century African-American people
20th-century African-American women